The Merchants and Planters Bank, also known as the Old LP&L District Office Building and now hosting the Bayou LaFourche Folklife and Heritage Museum is a historic bank building located at 110 Main Street in Lockport, Louisiana.

Built in 1910, the two-story masonry structure in Classical Revival style is one of the oldest extant buildings in downtown Lockport as it survived the 1916 Lockport fire.

The building was listed on the National Register of Historic Places on March 30, 1995.

See also
 National Register of Historic Places listings in Lafourche Parish, Louisiana

References

External links
Town of Lockport webpage about Bayou Lafourche Folklife and Heritage Museum
Bayou Lafourche Folklife and Heritage Museum website

Buildings and structures on the National Register of Historic Places in Louisiana		
Neoclassical architecture in Louisiana
Commercial buildings completed in 1910
Buildings and structures in Lafourche Parish, Louisiana
National Register of Historic Places in Lafourche Parish, Louisiana